Vallea is a genus of trees in the family Elaeocarpaceae. Trees in this genus are native to the Andes mountain range in South America and are classified in two species:

 Vallea ecuadorensis
 Vallea stipularis

References

Elaeocarpaceae
Elaeocarpaceae genera
Taxonomy articles created by Polbot